Xander Lambrix (born 25 March 2000) is a Belgian professional footballer who plays as a centre-back for Eerste Divisie club Roda JC.

Career
Lambrix is a youth academy graduate of Genk. On 16 July 2020, Dutch club Roda JC Kerkrade announced the signing of Lambrix on a two-year deal. He made his senior team debut on 30 August 2020 in a 4–0 win against Jong Ajax.

Career statistics

References

External links
 

2000 births
Living people
Association football defenders
Belgian footballers
Eerste Divisie players
Roda JC Kerkrade players
Belgian expatriate footballers
Belgian expatriate sportspeople in the Netherlands
Expatriate footballers in the Netherlands
People from Tongeren
Footballers from Limburg (Belgium)